Masao Morinaka (森中 聖雄, born April 9, 1974 in Shizuoka, Japan) is a former professional baseball player who played for the Yokohama BayStars. He currently works as a batting pitcher for the Yomiuri Giants organization.

Morinaka was drafted by the Yokohama BayStars in the second round of the 1996 amateur draft. He was a valuable left-handed reliever, but was dropped after only 7 seasons in 2003. He marked a 2.16 ERA in 41 appearances in 1999, and a 2.38 ERA in 53 appearances in 2000. He hit a home run at the Koshien baseball stadium in his final season.

He won a silver medal playing for the Japanese national team in the 1996 Summer Olympics before entering the Japanese professional leagues.

External links
 Career statistics

1974 births
Living people
Baseball people from Shizuoka Prefecture
Baseball players at the 1996 Summer Olympics
Olympic baseball players of Japan
Olympic silver medalists for Japan
Yokohama BayStars players
Olympic medalists in baseball
Medalists at the 1996 Summer Olympics